Richard G. Pestell  is an Australian American oncologist and endocrinologist who is Distinguished Professor, Translational Medical Research, and the President of the Pennsylvania Cancer and Regenerative Medicine Research Center at the Baruch S. Blumberg Institute. He was previously Executive Vice President of Thomas Jefferson University and Director of the Sidney Kimmel Cancer Center of Thomas Jefferson University. Pestell was appointed an Officer of the Order of Australia in the 2019 Queen's Birthday Honours for distinguished service to medicine and medical education.

Education and early career 
A native of Perth, Western Australia, Pestell attended Christ Church Grammar School. He attended the University of Western Australia School of Medicine, receiving his M.B.B.S. He conducted clinical training in internal medicine, oncology and endocrinology. He was awarded the Fellow of the Royal Australian College of Physicians (FRACP) in 1989. He received a Ph.D. in 1991 and M.D. in 1997 from the University of Melbourne. He was the recipient of both the Neal Hamilton Fairley Fellowship, and the Winthrop Fellowship of the Royal Australian College of Physicians. He became a postdoctoral clinical and research fellow in medicine at the Massachusetts General Hospital and a postdoctoral research fellow in medicine at Harvard Medical School in 1991.

Career
Pestell was recruited as an Assistant Professor to the Department of Molecular Medicine at Northwestern University's Feinberg School of Medicine in Chicago, Illinois. He became an Associate Professor, and Professor, in the Departments of Medicine and Developmental and Molecular Biology at the Albert Einstein College of Medicine in New York. Pestell served as Chair of the Division of Endocrine-Dependent Tumor Biology at the Albert Einstein Cancer Center.

In 2002, Pestell was named Director of the Lombardi Cancer Center, the Francis L. and Charlotte Gragnani Endowed Chair, and Chairman of the Department of Oncology at the Georgetown University Medical Center. During this tenure, he also served as Associate Vice President of the Georgetown University Medical Center, at the Georgetown University School of Medicine. Pestell led the effort for renewal of the National Cancer Institute designation, and founded the Capital Breast Care Center with Andrea Jung of the Avon Foundation. In 2003, he was also named President of the US branch of the International Network for Cancer Treatment and Research.

From 2005 to 2015, Pestell was Director of the Sidney Kimmel Cancer Center in Philadelphia, Pennsylvania, and Executive Vice President of Thomas Jefferson University. He was the Founding Director for the Delaware Valley Institute for Clinical and Translational Science. He was called to give testimony to the Committee on Appropriations for the United States Senate in 2009.

In January 2019, Pestell was named Vice Chairman of the Board of the CytoDyn, Inc., which acquired his prior company, ProstaGene, in November 2018. As the Chief Medical Officer, he established the company's cancer clinical trial for the use of a CCR5 inhibitor (leronlimab) and FDA fast track designation in May 2019. He exited CytoDyn in July 2019 and is currently  member of the Wistar Institute Cancer Center Philadelphia and Blumberg Distinguished Professor.

Research

Pestell's work has more than 88023 citations and an H-index of 152, i10 index 476. He is ranked by Google Scholar for his areas of research including: cell cycle (#1), prostate cancer, Oncology and Breast cancer.

Pestell's research has included contributions to understanding of cancer onset and progression including breast and prostate cancer. Pestell showed that nuclear receptors (estrogen, androgen and PPARγ) are acetylated, and that this event is rate-limiting in hormone signaling and growth control- thus identifying a new target for cancer therapy. His laboratory demonstrated this was a general mechanism conserved among nuclear receptors that affect diverse biological processes.

In the cell cycle field, Pestell's research has shown the discovery that cyclins are direct transcriptional targets of oncogenic and tumour suppressor signals.  He showed that cyclin expression is rate-limiting for oncogene-induced breast tumor growth in vivo. He has been a pioneer of the non-canonical functions of cyclins and was the first to show that cyclins regulate diverse function including miRNA biogenesis, cellular migration, mitochondrial metabolism (the Warburg effect), angiogenesis and nuclear receptor function and hormone signaling in vivo.

Pestell defined key target genes required for breast cancer stem cell expansion in vivo including p21Cip1, c-Jun, the canonical NF-κB pathway, the cell fate determination pathway protein DACH1, and CCR5.

Pestell discovered CCR5 governs cancer metastasis in both breast and prostate cancer  providing the potential for therapeutic targeting with issued patents in this domain. Pestell incorporated these patents into a biotechnology company he had founded (ProstaGene), that was subsequently acquired by CytoDyn. Pestell subsequently initiated the company's currently active cancer treatment clinical trial initiatives targeting CCR5 receiving fast track designation in May 2019.

Pestell is the founder of four biotechnology companies and holds patents in the areas of cancer diagnostics, therapeutics and technologies.

Awards and honours
1998 — 2002 Irma T. Hirschl Weil Caulier Career Scientist Award
 2000 Elected Member, American Society for Clinical Investigation
 2002 Diane Belfer Faculty Scholar in Cancer Research 
 2002 Francis L. and Charlotte Gragnani Endowed Chair, professor with tenure, Georgetown University, Washington, DC
 2005 Australia Endocrine Society, Keith Harrison Memorial Lecture Prize
 2007 Elected Fellow, Royal Society of Medicine
 2008 Doctor Honoris Causa, University of Western Australia
 2009 Elected Fellow, College of Physicians of Philadelphia
 2009 Elected Honorary Fellow, American College of Physicians
 2010 RD Wright Medallion, University of Melbourne
 2010 Susan G. Komen for the Cure "Light of Life" Award
 2010 Raine Distinguished Professor
 2011 Elected Fellow, American Association for the Advancement of Science
 2014 Biotechnology Award, 2014 Advance Global Australian Awards
 2015 The Eric Sussman Prize Awarded by The Royal Australasian College of Physicians
 2016 Doctor of Medical Sciences, Honoris Causa, University of Melbourne Australia  
 2016 Member, National Academy of Inventors, Thomas Jefferson University Chapter  
 2016 Jamie Brooke Lieberman Remembrance Award, Susan G. Komen   
 2019 Order of Australia (AO)
 2022 Elected to Fellowship of Royal College of Physicians of Ireland (FRCPI)

Personal life
Pestell is married to Anna Pestell and has three children. He is the great-grandson of Albert Green, Minister for Defence under the Scullin Government.

In 1984, Pestell won the WA State running (5,000 meters track, 10,000 meters road) and walking championships (5,000 m, 20K and 50K).

Selected publications

References

Australian emigrants to the United States
Massachusetts General Hospital fellows
Georgetown University faculty
American oncologists
Living people
American endocrinologists
Year of birth missing (living people)
Harvard Medical School people
Officers of the Order of Australia